A Dying Light in Corduba is a 1996 historical mystery crime novel by Lindsey Davis and the eighth book of the Marcus Didius Falco Mysteries series.  Set in Rome and Imperial Spain during the spring and summer of AD 73, the novel stars Marcus Didius Falco, informer and imperial agent. The title refers to the setting of much of the action, Corduba, as well as to the olive oil which features heavily in the plot, one use of which is for lamp oil.

Plot summary 

The Society of Olive Oil Producers of Baetica is throwing a big dinner party in Rome, trying to drum up business for their product.  Falco is invited at the request of Claudius Laeta, Vespasian’s top clerk.  The food, the garum and the dancing girl make a big impression on Falco.  When two guests at a dinner are assaulted, one fatally, Falco realizes that being at the dinner was just the start of another job.

The surviving victim, Anacrites, is Falco's rival and Vespasian's Chief Spy, a significant position in Vespasian's empire, challenged as it was by constant conspiracies.  Falco is asked to investigate the attack on Anacrites and its possible connection to an attempt to corner the market on Spanish olive oil.  Trying to keep Anacrites safe, he moves him to the one place where no one will look, and if they do, they will regret it; his mother’s house.

Soon, Falco is on his way to Hispania to track down some of the guests and that memorable dancer.  Laeta hints that someone is looking to corner the market on Hispania’s olive oil production.  Suspicion immediately falls on Quinctius Attractus, the host of the festivities that fatal evening.

This is an assignment Falco does not take solo; he is bringing his very pregnant companion, Helena Justina.  Helena's father Camillus Verus happens to own a small estate in Baetica, and her brother Aelianus has just returned for serving there, so he and Helena have a perfect excuse to show up.  And Helena has made it very clear that Falco will be there for the birth of his child.

Helena becomes friendly with the daughters of two local magnates, Claudia Rufina and Aelia Annaea.  Falco gets to know some of the sons, including Claudia’s brother Constans.  Also appearing is Attractus’ son Quadratus, the new quaestor of Baetica.  That one item alone keeps Falco on guard.

While concluding the interviews of the dinner guests, Falco finally catches up with the dancer, Selia, who promptly tries to kill him with the help of her band.  Before she strikes the final blow, she reveals that Laeta sent her too, not to find the killer, but to stop anyone following, a classic double cross.  Now Falco knows all, or nearly all.

Falco suspects something, but the obvious suspect is his guest and claiming an injury.  Yet Claudia is convinced it was not an accident, and she asks Falco to investigate.  Seeing the site of the death, he is convinced someone else was there when Constans died.  Now it is just one more thing he has to prove.

Now the chase is on.  Falco goes to the Quinctius estate, and finds Selia dead and Quadratus gone.  But this death is much more elegant, and soon another Dancer appears; Perella.  She is working for the Chief Spy Anacrites, who was still alive when she saw him last, now with the Praetorian guard, but still being nursed by Falco’s mother.

Still not trusting Perella, Falco decides to share his information with her, and they piece together the real plot.

Attractus and Quadratus are part of the plan because Laeta needs some legitimacy, and the Quinctii have enough influence to make it at least appear to be on the up and up.  Falco also learns that Quadratus was indeed with Constans when he died.  It is now time to act.

Helena is about to burst, but Falco is still fearful of local medical experts, and so he sends her east by land while he rides to catch Quadratus before he kills someone else, and then hopes to catch up.

It’s a girl.  Falco makes it before the birth, Helena survives, and only breaks a couple of his fingers.

Characters in A Dying Light in Corduba

Romans
 A. Camillus Aelianus - Eldest son of Decimus Camillus Verus
 Anacrites - Imperial spy
 Calisthenus - Architect
 Cornelius - Ex-quaestor of Baetica
 Decimus Camillus Verus - Senator and father of Helena Justina
 Gn. Drusillus Placidus - Procurator
 Helena Justina - Daughter of the Senator Decimus Camillus Verus and wife of Falco
 Helva - Usher
 Julia Justa - Wife of Camillus Verus and mother of Helena
 Junilla Tacita - Mother of Falco 
 L. Petronius Longus - Enquiry chief in the XIII region and friend of Falco
 Marcus Didius Falco - Informer and Imperial Agent from the Aventine.
 Momus - Slave overseer
 Perella - Dancer
 Q. Camillus Justinus - Youngest son of Decimus Camillus Verus
 Quinctius Attractus - Senator
 Stertius - Transport manager
 T. Claudius Laeta - Imperial clerk
 T. Quinctius Quadratus - Son of Quinctius Attractus
 Titus Caesar - Eldest son of the Emperor
 Valentinus - Imperial agent
 Vespasian - Emperor

Baeticans
 Aelia Annaea - Widow
 Annaeus Maximus - Landowner
 Claudia Adorata - Wife of Licinius Rufius
 Claudia Rufina - Granddaughter of Licinius Rufius
 Cyzacus Junior - Poet
 Cyzacus Senior - Bargee
 Gorax - Retired gladiator
 Licinius Rufius - Landowner
 Marius Optatus - Tenant
 Marmarides - Driver
 Norbanus - Negotiator
 Rufius Constans - Grandson of Licinius Rufius
 Selia - Dancer

Allusions/references to actual history, geography and current science
 Set in Rome and Baetica in AD 73, during the reign of Emperor Vespasian.

Release details
1996, UK, Century, Pub date 6 June 1996, hardback (First edition)
1998, USA, Mysterious Press, Pub date ? January 1998, hardback
 2003, UK, Arrow, Paperback (as part of single-volume omnibus edition, Falco on the Loose, with Last Act in Palmyra and Time to Depart)

References

External links
lindseydavis.co.uk/  Author's Official Website

1996 British novels
Marcus Didius Falco novels
Historical novels
Novels set in Spain
Córdoba, Spain
73
Century (imprint) books